The Ljubenić mass graves were alleged killings committed by Serbian police and paramilitary forces in the village of Ljubenić (alb. Lybeniq) near Peć, during the Kosovo War 1998-1999.

On 25 May 1998, at least eight villagers of Ljubenić, mostly Hamzaj family members, were extrajudicially executed by a group of police officers.

On 1 April 1999, Ljubenić was the site of a mass killing of about 66 men according to local villagers.

25 May 1998 
At around 6:45 am, on 25 May 1998, there was an incident on the road between Dečani and Peć, near the village of Ljubenić, in which a car was shot at by armed men, supposedly Kosovo Liberation Army (UÇK) insurgents. Three men travelling in the car were hit by the bullets, including the driver, a police officer and a reserve police officer, who was apparently off-duty.

That afternoon, sometime after 1 pm, Serb police forces travelling in various vehicles, some of which were armoured, arrived at Ljubenić. The police-officers positioned themselves in the outskirts of the village and fired on the Albanian villagers using artillery and other weapons, before entering the village itself.

Most of the villagers had fled to the nearby forest. Those who could not flee sheltered in the houses as best they could. After a short while, police patrols conducted house to house searches. The police officers then discovered fourteen people hiding in a large house. They forced them into the yard and then separated the men from the women and children. The women and children were instructed to go to Albania. The police then started to beat the men, who were unarmed, and then ordered them to run and shot them while they were running. Altogether, four men were killed this way: Ibrahim Hamzaj (64), Imer Hamzaj (53), Dervish Hamzaj (51) and Bashkim Hamzaj (23).

The police had also entered the house of Zeqë Hamzaj (aged 68 years). They took him and his sons, Gani Hamzaj (25) and Rifat Hamzaj (24) out of the building, made them strip to their underwear, then beat them and killed them. Another man, Haxhi Goga (22) from the town of Dečani, who was a guest of one family, was also extrajudicially killed.

1 April 1999 
According to Albanian villagers of Ljubenić allegedly surviving the massacre, on 1 April 1999, police and paramilitary forces entered Ljubenić. Many villagers tried to flee to the mountains but soon realized that they were surrounded. The villagers were gathered in the centre of the Ljubenić, the men and women were separated, and a large group of men were lined up against a wall on the main street of the village. After a series of insults, all the men were ordered to lie down, and the police-officers proceeded to shoot at them with machine-gun fire. Afterwards, they shot in the head all those who were still moving. Some of the men survived under the corpses and crawled out after the police-officers had gone. The other villagers, mostly women and children were forced to leave the village and had to walk to the Albanian border via Đakovica. The houses in the village were then torched.

OSCE, documenting the event on 1 July, conducting several interviews with alleged survivors, only found four bodies, unidentified at the time. Italian troops claimed that a mass grave with 350 bodies was found in the village, which was proved false, as only five bodies were found the next day. "Eyewitnesses" first told of the 350 bodies.

Western media exaggerated events of the Kosovo War, unsubstantially based on false US and NATO claims. Ljubenic is one of many examples of this.

See also

 Kosovo War
 War crimes in the Kosovo War
 List of massacres in the Kosovo War
 Violence against men

References

Sources

External links
 Massacre in Lybeniq: photographs

Massacres in the Kosovo War
Kosovo War
Law enforcement in Serbia
1998 in Kosovo
1999 in Kosovo
1998 murders in Serbia
1999 murders in Serbia
Mass murder in 1999
Mass murder in 1998
Massacres of men
Violence against men in Europe
Anti-Albanian sentiment